Čaka is a village and municipality in the Levice District in the Nitra Region of south-west Slovakia.

History
In historical records the village was first mentioned in 1287.

Geography
The village lies at an altitude of 188 metres and covers an area of 9.069 km².
It has a population of about 830 people.

Facilities
The village has a public library a gym and a  football pitch.

Genealogical resources

The records for genealogical research are available at the state archive "Statny Archiv in Nitra, Slovakia"

 Roman Catholic church records (births/marriages/deaths): 1654-1895 (parish A)
 Lutheran church records (births/marriages/deaths): 1785-1896 (parish B)
 Reformated church records (births/marriages/deaths): 1784-1903 (parish B)

See also
 List of municipalities and towns in Slovakia

References

External links
http://caka.mr-laurentius.sk
Surnames of living people in Caka

Villages and municipalities in Levice District